Milkuri Gangavva is an Indian YouTuber, comedian and actress. She used to work as a farm-worker before becoming popular on YouTube. Gangavva is known for her diction of Telangana dialect of Telugu language. In 2020, she entered the Telugu reality TV show Bigg Boss 4 as one of the 19 contestants.

Early life 
Gangavva hails from Lambadipally village of Telangana state's Jagitial district. No record exists of her birth date. Gangavva received no formal education as she dropped out during her first grade. She was married off when she was five. Gangavva had four children, three daughters and a son, including a daughter who died.

Career 
Gangavva used to work in agriculture fields and rolled cigarettes before venturing into YouTube in 2016. She was approached by son-in-law Srikanth Sriram to feature in his channel My Village Show which focuses village culture and rural life of Telangana. She started off with guest appearances before acting full-time from 2017. Gangavva's comedic roles in the series gained her wide recognition.

Gangavva's unique diction of Telangana's dialect made her popular among the Telugu people. In 2019, Gangavva made her Telugu cinema debut with Mallesham and later that year she also appeared in iSmart Shankar. 

In 2020, on the occasion of International Women's Day, Gangavva received Women Achiever Award from Tamilisai Soundararajan, Governor of Telangana.

Filmography

Films

Television

References

External links

Indian YouTubers
People from Telangana
Living people
Bigg Boss (Telugu TV series) contestants
Year of birth missing (living people)
Actresses from Telangana
Telugu actresses
Actresses in Telugu cinema
21st-century Indian actresses
Indian film actresses
Telugu comedians
Indian women comedians